Company sports is organized sport activities within companies, occupational groups, trade unions and public agencies, with the goal to improve the working atmosphere. The form of organization is an alternative to the offerings through regular national sport federations and their special federations. Company sport members can sometimes also participate in sport events under those national federations, like for instance in some marathons, but then often in their own separate classes.

Motivations behind company sport groups includes increasing the health and well-being by maintenance of social contacts, to have fun, recover, promote activation and physical activity, to achieve good results for oneself or for the team, or to acquire a good performance. Company sports can help compensate for the physical and mental stresses in everyday working life.

Organization 
 World Federation for Company Sport (WFCS) was founded 2 June 2014.
 European Federation for Company Sport (EFCS) was founded 1962.

Company sports are organized internationally through the World Federation for Company Sport (WFCS). The WFCS was founded 2 June 2014 after a series of communications between the European Federation for Company Sport (EFCS) was founded 1962.) and company sport organisations in Asia.

Members

Member organizations in the World Federation for Company Sport include:

World
26 Nations (17 Europe + 5 Asia + 3 Americas + 1 Africa) in May 2022:

 
 
 
 
 
 
 
 
 
 
 
 
 
 
 
 
 
 
 
 
 
 
 
 
 
 

Former Members:

Europe
34 Nations (36 Organization) in May 2022:

 
 
 
  (FROS - LFBSEL)
 
 
 
 
 
 
 
 
 
 
 
 
 
 
 
 
 
 
 
 
 
 
 
  (Serbian Federation for Company Sport - Association Sport for All Serbia)

Games

World Company Sport Games

Summer Games
worldcompanysport.org/events/

2016 
2018 
2020  (was held in 2021)
2022 

Palma de Mallorca has hosted the 1st edition of the World Company Sport Games from June 1st to June 5th.

La Baule WCSG 2018 | 23 > 27 May 2018.

Athens WCSG LOGO 2021 Athens WCSG 2021 | 6 > 10 October 2021

Winter Games
No games until 2022.

European Company Sport Games
www.efcs.org/european-company-sport-games/

www.efcs.org/erasmus-projects/

Summer Games
From 800 participants in 1977 to more than 7000 in Salzburg in 2019.

www.cs-fs.cz/en/ecsg-2013/

European Company Sport Games 2013 in Prague

7416 participants it was the biggest sport even of 2013 in Prague. The participants came from 22 countries and competed in 30 sport disciplines.

European Summer Games 2021 Arnhem (European Company Sport Games 2021 postponed to 2022)

Summer Games 2019 - Salzburg, Austria, 22nd European Company Sport Games sixteen years after hosting them in 2003.

 1977: , {{}}
 1979: , {{}}
 1981: , {{}}
 1983: , {{}}
 1985: , {{}}
 1987: , {{}}
 1989: , {{}}
 1991: , {{}}
 1993: , {{}}
 1995: , {{}}
 1997: , {{}}
 1999: , {{}}
 2001: , {{}}
 2003: , {{}}
 2005: , {{}}
 2007: , {{}}
 2009: , {{}}
 2011: , {{}}
 2013: Prague, 
 2015: , {{}}
 2017: Ghent, 
 2019: Salzburg, 
 2021: Arnhem, 
 2023: , {{}} 
 2025: Frederikshavn,

Winter Games
Winter Games 2020 Strbske Pleso in 

Strbske Pleso will host the 15th Winter Sport Games. It will be larger than ever before.

 1992: , {{}}
 1994: , {{}}
 1996: , {{}}
 1998: , {{}}
 2000: , {{}}
 2002: , {{}}
 2004: , {{}}
 2006: , {{}}
 2008: , {{}}
 2010: , {{}}
 2012: , {{}}
 2014: , {{}}
 2016: , {{}}
 2018: , {{}}
 2020: Strbske Pleso,

Insurance 
It varies whether the company sport federations can be held liable for accidents during company sport events. Company sport federations may offer insurance to its members.

In some jurisdictions, like in Germany, injuries during company sports can be regarded as a "work accident" if certain requirements are fulfilled.

See also 
 Company team
 Sports marketing

References 

Sports business
Labor
Sports by type